Robert Hale (born August 22, 1933 in Kerrville, Texas) is an American bass-baritone opera singer. Although born in Texas, Hale spent his childhood in Louisiana. His family then moved to Oklahoma City, where he attended high school and college.  He graduated from Bethany-Peniel College (now Southern Nazarene University) in 1955 with a Bachelor of Music degree. He then completed his master's degree at the University of Oklahoma. While still at the University of Oklahoma, he won the National Association of Teachers of Singing Singer of the Year award and completed further studies at Boston University and the New England Conservatory of Music where he was awarded the Artist Diploma as well as winning the Metropolitan Opera National Council Auditions. He began his career as a recitalist appearing in concert halls across the United States and later made his operatic debut at New York City Opera, as Colline in La bohème (1967).

International career
Hale has appeared with the many leading opera houses including the Metropolitan Opera, Deutsche Oper Berlin, London's Royal Opera House, Covent Garden, Teatro alla Scala in Milan, Vienna State Opera, Gran Teatre del Liceu in Barcelona, Théâtre du Châtelet in Paris, Munich State Opera, Hamburg State Opera, San Francisco Opera, Royal Danish Opera, Finnish National Opera, Sydney Opera, Teatro Colón in Buenos Aires, and the Bolshoi Theatre in Moscow. He has sung his signature roles Wotan/Wanderer in Wagner's Ring Cycle in most major opera houses of the world as well as the title role in The Flying Dutchman for which he received the Russian Golden Mask Award in 2005 for his performance at the Bolshoi Theatre in Moscow.

His European festival appearances include the Salzburg Festival, Vienna, Ravenna, Lausanne, Bregenz, Bergen, Orange, Bordeaux, Munich, Savonlinna, and Vienna. In the USA, he has appeared at the Tanglewood Music Festival, Ravinia Festival, Cincinnati May Festival and at Wolftrap and the Hollywood Bowl.

Among the many concert halls where he has performed are New York's Carnegie Hall, London's Barbican Center and Royal Albert Hall, Vienna's Musikverein, the Berlin Philharmonie, Sidney, Tokyo  appearing with the major orchestras such as Boston, Philadelphia, Cleveland, Chicago, San Francisco, New York, Houston, Dallas, Los Angeles, Washington D.C., Toronto and Montreal. In Europe he has performed with the Vienna Philharmonic, Berlin Philharmonie, Amsterdam Concertgebouw Orchestra, Danish Radio Orchestra, Paris Radio Orchestra and others.

In the summer of 2009 Hale started performing in recitals and concerts (especially in churches) with his wife soprano Julie Davies, under the name "Hale & Davies: Celebration of Song." He had previously been half of the "Hale & Wilder" concert duo, performing together in over 4000 concerts.

He is a National Patron of Delta Omicron, an international professional music fraternity.

Recordings
Hale is featured on the Decca recording of Das Rheingold and Die Walküre with Christoph von Dohnányi conducting the Cleveland Orchestra, as well as The Flying Dutchman with Dohnányi conducting the Vienna Philharmonic, all three issued on compact discs. He is also featured in the role of Wotan/Wanderer on EMI's video recording of the complete Der Ring des Nibelungen cycle from the Bayerische Staatsoper in Munich with Wolfgang Sawallisch conducting (its soundtrack also issued on CD). His discography also includes Handel's Messiah with Sir John Eliot Gardiner on Decca, the Verdi Requiem, and Schumann's Das Paradies und die Peri for Deutsche Grammophon with Giuseppe Sinopoli. Hale can also be heard as Jochanaan in the Chandos 1998 recording of Salome.

Audio
 Handel: Messiah Philips
 Wagner: Das Rheingold Decca
 Wagner: Die Walküre Decca
 Wagner: Der fliegende Holländer Decca
 Wagner: Der Ring des Nibelungen EMI
 Strauss: Salome Chandos
 Schumann: Das Paradies und die Peri Deutsche Grammophon
 Song of Love (love songs from Broadway musicals, with Inga Nielsen) EMI

Video
 Strauss: Die Frau ohne Schatten, EMI
 Wagner: Der fliegende Holländer, EMI
 Wagner: Der Ring des Nibelungen (Bavarian State Opera in Munich, Sawallisch), EMI
 Bizet: Carmen (Live from Lincoln Center)
 Donizetti: Lucia di Lammermoor (Live from Lincoln Center)
 Schreker: Die Gezeichneten (Salzburg Festival)

Notes and references
Notes

Bibliography
 Rogers, Rick, Famed bass-baritone comes home, The Oklahoman, August 9, 2009. Accessed September 2, 2009.
 Buckley, Paul R., "Opera singer dons old mantle at church", Dallas Morning News, October 29, 2005. Accessed March 31, 2009.
 Cummings, David, International Who's Who in Classical Music 2003, Routledge, 2003, p. 313. 
 Rockwell, John, "'Dutchman': Robert Hale In Met Debut", New York Times, January 21, 1990. Accessed March 31, 2009.
 Some information in this article is taken from «Robert Hale» in the German Wikipedia. The source texts listed below are from the original article:
 Jens Malte Fischer: Große Stimmen, Suhrkamp Verlag
 Kutsch / Riemens, Großes Sängerlexikon, Saur Verlag

American operatic bass-baritones
1933 births
People from Kerrville, Texas
Living people
Winners of the Metropolitan Opera National Council Auditions
Singers from Texas
Singers from Louisiana
20th-century American male opera singers
21st-century American male opera singers
Classical musicians from Texas